Forgotten Babies is a 1933 Our Gang short comedy film directed by Robert F. McGowan.

Plot
The children are taking care of their baby brothers and sisters on a Saturday, but would much rather go swimming. They blackmail Spanky into doing the job for them, by threatening to reveal that he broke a neighbor's window. Spanky is left at home alone to mind all the babies.

He tells them a long, fractured story about Tarzan, but one baby slips away unnoticed and climbs the stairs. As Spanky hurries to bring him down with a cushion, the others start causing havoc around the house, such as tossing fish out of their bowl, throwing food from the icebox onto the kitchen floor for Pete the dog to eat, and using a vacuum cleaner to spray flour all over the kitchen. To keep the stair-climbing baby out of trouble, Spanky pours glue on the floor and makes him sit in it.

As he tries in vain to rein in the other babies, one of them turns on a radio (broadcasting a murder mystery), dials a telephone, and leaves the receiver in range of the speaker. The operators hear the broadcast and call the police, thinking that an actual murder is taking place. The police reach the house, find the radio, and confront the children when they return from swimming. As the water from an overflowing upstairs bathtub leaks through the ceiling, the children explain that they left Spanky in charge of the babies. They find him in the kitchen, where he has put two of the babies in birdcages; glued a third to the floor; used a chair, spittoons, and flatirons to immobilize a fourth; and barricaded Pete in a breadbox.

Cast
 George McFarland as Spanky
 Matthew Beard as Stymie
 Tommy Bond as Tommy
 Dorothy DeBorba as Dorothy
 Bobby Hutchins as Wheezer
 Dickie Moore as Dickie
 John Collum as Uh-huh
 Dickie Jackson as Dickie
 David Holt - Our Gang member
 Pete the Pup as himself

Additional cast
 Bobbie Beard as Cotton
 Dickie Hutchins as Baby who says "Remarkable"
 Tommy McFarland - Baby who breaks a lamp, jumps on the bed and overflows the bath tub
 Murlin Powers as Baby
 Duke Sexton as Baby
 Harry Bernard as Officer
 Estelle Etterre as Nemo's girl friend in broadcast / Telephone company operator
 Billy Gilbert as Radio station NIX announcer / Dr. Nemo, serial character
 Dick Gilbert as Officer
 Madeline McGowan as Telephone company operator

Notes
Forgotten Babies is a partial remake of Cradle Robbers.

See also
 Our Gang filmography

References

External links
 
 

1933 films
1933 comedy films
American black-and-white films
Films directed by Robert F. McGowan
Hal Roach Studios short films
Our Gang films
1930s American films